Phil(l)ip Sim(m)s may refer to:

P. Hal Sims (1886–1949), American bridge player
Phil Simms (born 1954), American football quarterback
Phillip Sims (American football) (born 1992), American football quarterback